The year 537 BC was a year of the pre-Julian Roman calendar. In the Roman Empire, it was known as year 217 Ab urbe condita. The denomination 537 BC for this year has been used since the early medieval period, when the Anno Domini calendar era became the prevalent method in Europe for naming years.

Events

By place

Judea 
The Jews lay the foundations for the Second Temple.

Births

Deaths 
 Duke Jing of Qin, ruler of the Chinese state of Qin from 576 to 537 BC

References